Russatus is a genus of small air-breathing land snails, terrestrial pulmonate gastropod mollusks in the family Charopidae.

Species
Species within the genus Russatus include:
 Russatus nigrescens

References

 Ubio.org info

 
Charopidae
Taxonomy articles created by Polbot